Volperhausen Castle is a castle in the municipality of Morsbach in the Oberbergischer Kreis of North Rhine-Westphalia, Germany.

Situation
Volperhausen Castle lies in four kilometres from Morsbach, but is still within the municipal area.

History
Volperhausen Castle was first mentioned in 1462. The castle was originally in the possession of the Count of Hatzfeld, but in latter years has changed ownership several times. It was earlier an outpost of the castle Crottorf.

Layout 
Today, the castle consists of a 3-story stone building with a slender staircase tower. The moat existing today, which was also used by the former mill beside the castle house, still "points" to the type of a moated castle. Today a dwelling house stands on the foundation walls of the mill. The castle is a private property and, hence, can be visited only from the outside.

References

External links 

 

Castles in North Rhine-Westphalia
Buildings and structures in Oberbergischer Kreis